Pal Zileri is an Italian luxury brand specialized in both formal and casual menswear. Pal Zileri is part of Forall Confezioni Spa.
The brand was born in Quinto Vicentino (Vicenza, Italy) and it is now headquartered in Milan. The brand is distributed via many monobrand stores and via 500 multibrand retailers worldwide.

History 

Forall Confezioni SpA was founded in 1980 as a company dedicated to the traditional menswear tailoring.

In the 80s, the company created Pal Zileri as the brand to firm its identity and position based on the Italian savoir-faire and artisanal knowledge. Pal Zileri evokes the name of "Palazzo Zileri" an ancient building in the historic centre of Vicenza. Pal Zileri worked with some of Italian designer labels to produce and distribute their menswear lines.

In 2014, Mayhoola Group acquired the majority stake of the company, and later, in 2016 gained the full ownership.
Pal Zileri pursues its sartorial craftsmanship combined with a contemporary aesthetic.

Further marking this new course, in July 2018 Marco Sanavia was appointed as Chief Executive Officer of Forall Confezioni S.p.A., owner of Pal Zileri.

Collections

Each Pal Zileri garment is made in the factory located in Quinto Vicentino or by the brand's network of selected Italian craftsmen. Pal Zileri line is designed for men and balances the Italian design tradition and innovation in terms of cut, design and materials. The collection is composed by formal menswear, casual and sportswear: suits, jackets, raincoats, overcoats, bomber jackets, pea jackets, slim fit pants, jacquard or printed shirts, leather goods, accessories (bags, backpacks, belts, etc.) and shoes.

Made to measure is a tailor-made and customized service that matches the italian handcraft tradition with a wide range of models and fabrics.

Distribution
The distribution includes the flagship store in Milan, 32 mono-brand boutiques (Moscow, Dubai, Mexico City, Lima, Baku and
Bogotá, to name only a few) and 500 multi-brand stores (Istanbul, London, Madrid, Paris, Saint Petersburg, Melbourne, and Sydney).
From 2019, the opening of Pal Zileri corners by top department stores such as Harrods and Selfridges in London, Galerie Lafayette and El Corte Ingles in Madrid.

See also 

 Italian fashion
 Made in Italy

References

External links

 

Clothing companies established in 1980
Italian companies established in 1980
Clothing brands of Italy
Italian suit makers
Luxury brands
High fashion brands
Shoe companies of Italy
Fashion accessory brands
Perfume houses
Companies based in Veneto